Saqi may refer to:

 Saqi (film), Indian fantasy film by H. S. Rawail based on the Arabian Nights
 Saqi, Markazi, a village in Iran
 Saqi, Amanabad, a village in Markazi Province, Iran
 Saqi, Razavi Khorasan, a village in Iran
 Saqi, South Khorasan, a village in Iran
 Saqi (actor) (1925 – 1986), a Pakistani film actor

See also
 Saki (disambiguation)